Arleta is a female given name. Notable people with this given name include:

 Arleta Richardson (1923–2004), American children's author
 Arleta Meloch (born 1979), Polish Paralympian runner
 Arleta Podolak (born 1993), Polish judoka at the 2016 Olympics
 Arleta Jeziorska (born 1970), Mexican actress

See also
 Arleta (1945–2017), Greek musician